Delany College is an independent Roman Catholic comprehensive co-educational secondary day school, located in Granville, a western suburb of Sydney, New South Wales, Australia; in the tradition of the Patrician Brothers. Founded in 1942 as the Patrician Brothers' High School, the College is administratively overseen by the Catholic Education Office of the Diocese of Parramatta.

Delany College  has enrolment of approximately 550 students from Year 7 to Year 12. Students are drawn from a number of local catholic schools including Holy Trinity Primary, Granville; Holy Family Primary, Granville East; St Patrick's Primary, Guildford and St Margaret Mary's Primary, Merrylands.

History
Delany College was established in 1942 as Patrician Brothers' High School, a Catholic, all-boys school catering for students in Years 5 to 10.

Patrician Brothers' High School became a Years 7 to 12, co-educational college in 1997, reformed by Quentin Evans, in order to meet the changing needs of the local community. The school was later renamed "Delany College" after the Patrician Brothers' founder, Bishop Daniel Delany.  In 1996 Evans founded the Catholic Terra Sancta College.

Notable alumni
Pat Farmer  – an ultra-marathon athlete, motivational speaker, and former Australian politician, who served as a Member of the House of Representatives (Lib.) from 2001 to 2010, representing Macarthur, New South Wales
 Kim Yeadon – a former politician who served as a member of the New South Wales Legislative Assembly (ALP) from 1990 to 2007; former NSW Minister for Energy 1999–2003

See also 

 List of Catholic schools in New South Wales
 Catholic Education, Diocese of Parramatta
 Catholic education in Australia

References

External links 
Delany College website

Patrician Brothers schools
Roman Catholic Diocese of Parramatta
Catholic secondary schools in Sydney
1942 establishments in Australia